Prairie goldenrod is a common name for several plants and may refer to:

Solidago missouriensis, native to Canada, the United States, and northern Mexico
Solidago nemoralis, native to Canada and the United States
Solidago ptarmicoides
Solidago rigida